Neochera privata is a moth in the family Erebidae. It is found from the Andamans, Sundaland, Nias and the Lesser Sundas to Timor.

The wingspan is about 50 mm.

Subspecies
Neochera privata fennekenae (Sulawesi)
Neochera privata privata (Andamans, Sundaland, Nias, Lesser Sundas, Timor)

External links
 The Moths of Borneo
 Species info

Aganainae
Moths of Asia
Moths described in 1862